This is a list of Canadian television related events from 1988.

Events

Debuts

Ending this year

Television shows

1950s
Country Canada (1954–2007)
Hockey Night in Canada (1952–present)
The National (1954–present)
Front Page Challenge (1957–1995)
Wayne and Shuster Show (1958–1989)

1960s
CTV National News (1961–present)
Land and Sea (1964–present)
Man Alive (1967–2000)
Mr. Dressup (1967–1996)
The Nature of Things (1960–present, scientific documentary series)
Question Period (1967–present, news program)
The Tommy Hunter Show (1965–1992)
W-FIVE (1966–present, newsmagazine program)

1970s
The Beachcombers (1972–1990)
Canada AM (1972–2016, news program)
Definition (1974–1989)
the fifth estate (1975–present, newsmagazine program)
Live It Up! (1978–1990)
Marketplace (1972–present, newsmagazine program)
You Can't Do That on Television (1979–1990)
100 Huntley Street (1977–present, religious program)

1980s
Bumper Stumpers (1987–1990)
The Campbells (1986–1990)
CityLine (1987–present, news program)
CODCO (1987–1993)
The Comedy Mill (1986–1991)
Danger Bay (1984–1990)
Degrassi Junior High (1987–1989)
The Journal (1982–1992)
Midday (1985–2000)
Night Heat (1985–1989)
On the Road Again (1987–2007)
The Raccoons (1985–1992)
Street Legal (1987–1994)
Super Dave (1987–1991)
Switchback (1981–1990)
Talkabout (1988-1990)
T. and T. (1987–1990)
Under the Umbrella Tree (1986–1993)
Venture (1985–2007)
Video Hits (1984–1993)

TV movies

Care Bears Nutcracker Suite
The King Chronicle
The Squamish Five
Two Men

Television stations

Debuts

See also
 1988 in Canada
 List of Canadian films of 1988

References